Warren Dale Barnes (born 8 May 1992) is a South African-born New Zealand cricketer who played for Otago. He made his List A debut on 27 December 2015 in the 2015–16 Ford Trophy. He made his first-class debut for Otago in the 2017–18 Plunket Shield season on 7 November 2017.

In December 2017, during a Twenty20 match between Otago and Northern Districts in the 2017–18 Super Smash, Barnes wore a protective helmet when he bowled. This is because it was felt he was particularly vulnerable due to his bowling action. The helmet is based on a hockey mask and was amended by a prosthetics designer in Dunedin to cover the top of the head.

In June 2018, he was awarded a contract with Otago for the 2018–19 season.

References

External links
 

1992 births
Living people
New Zealand cricketers
Otago cricketers
Cricketers from Johannesburg
South African emigrants to New Zealand